The Rivière aux Outardes (English: Bustard River) is a tributary of the Saguenay River, flowing in the municipality of Saint-Fulgence, in the Le Fjord-du-Saguenay Regional County Municipality, in the administrative region of Saguenay-Lac-Saint-Jean, in the province of Quebec, in Canada.

The route 172 (route de Tadoussac) crosses the Outardes River at its mouth. Chemin du rang Saint-Louis (north–south direction) serves the western side of this river.

Forestry is the primary economic activity in the sector; recreational tourism, second.

The surface of the Outardes River is usually frozen from the end of November to the beginning of April, however the safe circulation on the ice is generally done from mid-December to the end of March.

Geography 
The main watersheds neighboring the Rivière aux Outardes are:
 North side: Valin River, Saint-Louis River, Canada stream;
 East side: Rivière aux Foins, Saguenay River, Sainte-Marguerite River;
 South side: Saguenay River;
 West side: Loutre river, Valin River, Caribou River, Shipshaw River.

The Rivière aux Outardes rises at the mouth of Lake Xavier.

From its source, the confluence of Lake Xavier, the course of the Outardes River descends on  according to the following segments:
  south-west to chemin du rang Sainte-Marie;
  south-west in a deep valley, to a stream (coming from the north);
  south in a deep valley, to the mouth of the river 

The mouth of the Rivière aux Outardes flows onto the north bank of the Saguenay River in the municipality of Saint-Fulgence. This confluence of the Rivière aux Outardes is located at:
  west of the village center of Saint-Fulgence;
  north-east of downtown Saguenay;
  west of the mouth of the Saguenay River.

From the mouth of the Outardes river, the current follows the course of the Saguenay river up to Tadoussac where it merges with the Saint-Laurent river.

Toponymie 
The toponym Rivière aux Outardes was formalized on December 5, 1968, at the Place Names Bank of the Commission de toponymie du Québec.

See also 
 Le Fjord-du-Saguenay Regional County Municipality
 Saint-Fulgence
 Saguenay River

Notes and references 

Rivers of Saguenay–Lac-Saint-Jean
Le Fjord-du-Saguenay Regional County Municipality